Josip Vogrinc is a former international table tennis player from Yugoslavia.

He won a bronze medal in the Swaythling Cup (men's team event) at the 1951 World Table Tennis Championships.

See also
 List of table tennis players
 List of World Table Tennis Championships medalists

References

Yugoslav table tennis players
World Table Tennis Championships medalists